The Harris Park School is a school building in Westminster, Colorado that was built from 1892–1899. The building was originally Romanesque Revival in architecture style, but was remodeled in the 1920s to incorporate the Craftsman style.

The building continues to serve schoolchildren today, now under the name of Pleasant DeSpain, Sr. School. The property was listed on the National Register of Historic Places in 1990.

See also 
 National Register of Historic Places listings in Adams County, Colorado

References 

School buildings completed in 1899
1899 establishments in Colorado
National Register of Historic Places in Adams County, Colorado
School buildings on the National Register of Historic Places in Colorado
Buildings and structures in Adams County, Colorado